Sobe may refer to:

People
 Sobe (sister of Saint Anne)
 Sobe Charles Umeh

Other
 SoBe, American brand of teas
 SoBe Entertainment
 South Beach, a neighborhood of Miami Beach, Florida